George Huang may refer to:

 George Huang (director), film director
 George Huang (Law & Order: Special Victims Unit), a character on Law & Order
 George Huang (businessman), an Acer Inc. founder
 George Huang (politician) (born 1935), Taiwanese politician